Octavio Valdez Martínez (born 7 December 1973) is a Mexican former professional footballer who played as a midfielder.

Valdez began his career by debuting on January 11, 1997, with Pachuca, in a 2–1 loss to Necaxa. After four years in Pachuca, he got transferred to Club América. Later he moved to Toluca for two seasons (Aperura 2002), (Clausura 2003). Valdez later returned to Pachuca for two years. In the Aperura 2005 he got transferred to San Luis where he played until 2008.

Honours
Pachuca
Mexican Championship: Invierno 1999, Apertura 2003

America
Mexican Championship: Verano 2002
CONCACAF Giants Cup: 2001

Toluca
Mexican Championship: Apertura 2002

Mexico
CONCACAF Gold Cup: 2003

External links
 

C.F. Pachuca players
Deportivo Toluca F.C. players
Club América footballers
San Luis F.C. players
C.F. Monterrey players
Liga MX players
CONCACAF Gold Cup-winning players
Footballers from the State of Mexico
2001 FIFA Confederations Cup players
2001 Copa América players
2003 CONCACAF Gold Cup players
2004 Copa América players
1973 births
Living people
Association football midfielders
Mexico international footballers
C.F. Pachuca non-playing staff
Mexican footballers